Raja Todar Mal (1 January 1500 – 8 November 1589) was the Finance Minister (Mushriff-i-Diwan) of the Mughal empire during Emperor Akbar's reign. He was also the Vakil-us-Sultanat (Counsellor of the Empire) and Joint Wazir. He was one of the premier nobles in the Mughal Empire and was a Mansabdar of 4000. He was one of the Navaratnas in Akbar's court. Under Todar Mal, there were 15 other Dewans nominated for 15 Subahs of Akbar.

Life
Todar Mal was born in the town of Laharpur in present-day Uttar Pradesh in a  Hindu family, considered by historians as either Agarwal, Khatri or Kayastha. Todar Mal's father died when he was very young leaving no means of livelihood for him. Todar Mal started his career from the humble position of a writer but slowly moved up the ranks when Sher Shah Suri, the Sur emperor, assigned him to the charge of building a new fort of Rohtas in Punjab with the objective of preventing Ghakkar raids and to also act as a barrier to the Mughals in the north-west.

After the Sur dynasty was overthrown by the Mughals, Todar Mal continued in the service of the ruling power, which was now the Mughal Emperor Akbar. Under Akbar, he was placed in charge of Agra. Later, he was made governor of Gujarat. At various times, he also managed Akbar's Mint at Bengal and served in Punjab. Todar Mal's most significant contribution, which is appreciated even today, is that he overhauled the revenue system of Akbar's Mughal empire. Raja Todar Mal built a fortress-palace at Laharpur in the Sitapur district of Uttar Pradesh.

Beveridge records that Raja Todar Mal had got leave from Akbar and was on his way to Haridwar, but he received a letter from Akbar in which the latter is said to have written that "it was better to go on working and doing good to the world than to go on a pilgrimage." Todar Mal also translated Bhagavata Purana into Persian.

Following Todar Mal's death on 8 November 1589 in Lahore, his body was cremated according to the Hindu traditions. Raja Bhagwan Das, his colleague in the charge of Lahore, was present at the ceremony. Of his two sons, Dhari was killed in a battle in Sindh. Another son, Kalyan Das, was sent by Todar Mal to subdue the Raja of Kumaon in the Himalayas. He rose to become the Finance Minister in Akbar's Darbar.

As a soldier
Todar Mal is recognized as an able warrior, who led in various battles.

In Malwa 

In July 1564, Todar Mal accompanied Akbar in his campaign against Abdullah Khan Uzbeg, the subahdar of Malwa, who had revolted against the imperial authority. No reason of 'Abdullah's rebellion is furnished by the contemporary writers. Probably, having got the post of a governor he became power-corrupt and decided to become independent. Akbar became very much disturbed and decided to punish him. The emperor started his march on the pretext of elephant hunting on 2 July 1564. The imperial army reached the village Liwani in Indore on 5 August and on the 6th completely defeated 'Abdullah Khan Uzbeg, who fled to Gujarat. The imperial forces returned to the capital on 9 October 1564.

According to Abu-l-Fazl there were 300 officers with the emperor on the day of victory. He gives the name of thirty (30) officers including that of Todar Mal As there is no other mention of Todar Mal's activities, it can be stated that he was with Akbar in his Malwa expedition from start to finish (2 July – 9 October 1564).

As a Finance minister of Akbar
Todar Mal succeeded Khwaja Malik I'timad Khan in 1560. Raja Todar Mal introduced standard weights and measures, a land survey and settlement system, revenue districts and officers. This system of maintenance by Patwari is still used in Indian Subcontinent which was improved by British Raj and Government of India.

Raja Todar Mal, as finance minister of Akbar, introduced a new system of revenue known as zabt and a system of taxation called dahshala. His revenue collection arrangement came to be known as the Todarmal's Bandobast 

He took a careful survey of crop yields and prices cultivated for a 10-year period 1570–1580. On this basis, tax was fixed on each crop in cash. Each province was divided into revenue circles with their own rates of revenue and a schedule of individual crops. This system was prevalent where the Mughal administration could survey the land and keep careful accounts. For the revenue system, Akbar's territory was divided into 15 Subahs, which were further subdivided into a total of 187 Sarkars across 15 subahs, and those 187 sarkars (sirkar) were further subdivided into a total of 3367 Mahals or Pargana. Several Mahals were grouped into Dasturs, a unit between Mahal and Sirkar. Portion of larger Mahal or Pargana was called taraf. Mahals was subdivided into standardised Bighas. A Bigha was made of 3600 Ilahi Gaj, which is roughly half of modern acre. Unit of measurement was standardised to Ilahi Gaj, which was equivalent to 41 fingers (29-32 inches). Lead measuring rope, called Tenab, was also standardised by joining pieces of Bamboo with iron rings so that the length of Tenab did not vary with seasonal changes.

This system was not applicable in the provinces like Gujarat and Bengal.

Sometime between 1582 and 1584, as finance minister, Raja Todar Mal issued a decree which stated that all Mughal administration was to be written in Persian and in the "Iranian style". The decree also stated that the Mughal administration was to be staffed by Iranian and Hindu clerks, secretaries and scribes.His systematic approach to revenue collection became a model for the future Mughals as well as the British.

Death
Todar Mal died in Lahore on 8 November 1589.

Legacy
The Kashi Vishwanath Temple was rebuilt in 1585 by Todar Mal. This temple was later demolished by Aurangzeb, who had the Gyanvapi Mosque built on its ruins. The current Kashi Vishwanath Temple was built later by Ahilyabai Holkar on an adjacent plot of land.

The academic consensus holds that Persian rose to become the dominant language of the Mughal government after the 1582-1584 administrative decree was issued by Raja Todar Mal. Persian would hold such status within the Mughal bureaucracy all the way into early colonial India; eventually, in the 1830s, it would lose such status as the British made coordinated attempts to replace it with English (see also; English Education Act 1835).

In popular culture
In the historical serial, Bharat Ek Khoj, Todar Mal was played by popular character actor, Harish Patel in the two episodes (Episodes 32 and 33) on the life and times of Emperor Akbar.

Todar Mal is featured in the video games Sid Meier's Civilization IV: Beyond the Sword, Sid Meier's Civilization V: Gods and Kings, and most recently in Sid Meier's Civilization VI as a "great merchant".

In the Indian movie Jodhaa Akbar, Raja Todar Mal is portrayed by Pramod Moutho.
In the Indian historical fiction television series Jodha Akbar, Todar Mal is portrayed by Shaurya Singh.

References

Resources
 "Abū al-Fażl “ʿAllāmī” ibn Mubārak, Šayḫ" and "The Ain i Akbari", vol. 1.  Persian Texts in Translation, The Packard Humanities Institute.
 The Akbarnama also is available online at: http://persian.packhum.org/persian/

External links

http://www.engr.mun.ca/~asharan/TODARMAL/TODARMALV6.pdf

Mughal nobility
Medieval India
16th-century Indian monarchs
1589 deaths
Indian Hindus
Akbar
1500 births